The College of General Dentistry is an un-chartered college of dentistry in the United Kingdom. opened in July 2021.

Membership is open to members of the Faculty of General Dental Practice.

The college publishes the Primary Dental Journal.

References

External links

Dentistry
Professional associations